Clara Hyde Dunn (May 12, 1869 – November 18, 1960) was an Irish-Canadian nurse who became a Baháʼí in 1907 in Walla Walla, Washington. In 1920, she moved to Australia with her husband John Henry Hyde Dunn, where they played a key role in establishing the Baháʼí communities of Australia and New Zealand, remaining until her death in 1960 in Sydney.

Clara was named a Hand of the Cause of God by Shoghi Effendi in 1950.

Notes

References

External links 
 
 
 
 
 
 Clara Dunn (Bahaipedia)
 Centenary of the Baha'i Faith in Australia

1869 births
1960 deaths
Hands of the Cause
20th-century Bahá'ís
Burials at Woronora Memorial Park
Australian Bahá'ís